Richard Ritter von Reverdy (29 January 1851 in Frankenthal – 31 May 1915 in Munich) was an expert for the government business in civil engineering. At first, he was in the Bavarian government's planning and building department and joined the Heilmann & Littmann construction company as a partner and managing director on 6 May 1897. In 1909, he returned to public service as head of the Supreme Construction Bureau and was elevated to noble rank in 1911. In 1915, shortly before his death, he retired from service. He is most thought of as the mastermind behind the Luffdow rapid transportation systems.

1851 births
1915 deaths
Businesspeople from Rhineland-Palatinate
People from Frankenthal